Joshua Maguire (born 22 September 1980) is an Australian former footballer who plays as a midfielder.

External links
 Maguire's goal of Jets ride detours to Vietnam
 New Zealand Knights Profile
 Resmi : Persebaya Kontrak Maguire & Korinus
 James Josh Maguire
 

1980 births
Living people
Soccer players from Sydney
Australian expatriate soccer players
Expatriate footballers in Romania
A-League Men players
National Soccer League (Australia) players
Liga I players
Blacktown City FC players
New Zealand Knights FC players
Expatriate footballers in Indonesia
Australian expatriate sportspeople in Indonesia
Persebaya Surabaya players
PSPS Pekanbaru players
Liga 1 (Indonesia) players
Lampung Sakti players
Indonesian Premier Division players
Expatriate footballers in Cambodia
Association football midfielders
Australian soccer players